The 2012 Dally M Awards were presented on Tuesday 4 September 2012 at the Sydney Town Hall and broadcast on Fox Sports. They are the official annual awards of the 2012 NRL season.

Dally M Medal

Dally M Awards
The Dally M Awards were, as usual, conducted at the close of the regular season and hence do not take games played in the finals series into account. The Dally M Medal is for the official player of the year while the Provan-Summons Medal is for the fans' of "people's choice" player of the year.

Team of the Year

See also
Dally M Awards
Dally M Medal
2012 NRL season

References

Dally M Awards
Dally M Awards
2012